Finley is an unincorporated community in Lake County, California.

The first post office at Finley opened in 1907. The name is for settler Samuel Finley Sylar.

Climate
This region experiences warm (but not hot) and dry summers, with no average monthly temperatures above 71.6 °F.  According to the Köppen Climate Classification system, Finley has a warm-summer Mediterranean climate, abbreviated "Csb" on climate maps.

References

Unincorporated communities in California
Unincorporated communities in Lake County, California